The All Blacks first played against Ireland in 1905, during the historic 1905–1906 All Blacks tour of Europe and North America, beating Ireland 15–0 at Lansdowne Road, Dublin. The two teams have played a total of 36 Test matches, with the All Blacks winning 30, Ireland winning 5, and 1 match drawn. 

During the 2012 Irish Tour of New Zealand, New Zealand won all three tests, scoring 124 points to Ireland's 29. This tour also saw New Zealand post the biggest winning margin against Ireland in their history, with a score of 60–0 on 23 June 2012.	
On 24 November 2013, New Zealand were trailing 22–17 against Ireland in the final minute of the match, and on the verge of their first ever loss to Ireland. Ireland gave up a penalty with under 30 seconds remaining, which ultimately led to New Zealand working their way up the field, ending in a try to tie the score. The try was converted at the second time of asking, handing New Zealand the victory and their perfect season. 

Ireland eventually ended a 111-Year wait for a victory at Soldier Field, Chicago with a 40–29 win on 5 November 2016. On 17 November 2018, Ireland beat New Zealand 16–9 at the Aviva Stadium, Dublin to record their first ever home win against the All Blacks.

During the Autumn Nations Series of 2021, Ireland defeated New Zealand 29–20 at home to record their third win in five against the All Blacks. Despite their desperately poor record against the All Blacks until 2016, the six matches between 2013 and 2021 were shared three each in highly contested encounters between teams at the top of the world rankings. As such, media in both countries have noted that a significant modern rivalry now exists between the two nations, which have similar population sizes.

Ireland scored their first victory against the All Blacks on New Zealand soil on 9 July 2022, their fourth win over New Zealand. The following week Ireland became just the fifth touring side to achieve a series win in New Zealand, beating the All Blacks 22–32 in Wellington for a 2-1 series victory.

Summary

Overall

Records
Note: Date shown in brackets indicates when the record was or last set.

Attendance
Up to date as of 9 January 2023

Results

List of series

See also
 History of rugby union matches between Munster and New Zealand 
 The Original All Blacks
 The Invincibles (rugby union)

References

External links

Complete List of Results at ESPN

 
New Zealand national rugby union team matches
Ireland national rugby union team matches
Irish-New Zealand culture
Rugby union rivalries in New Zealand
Rugby union rivalries in Ireland